Parapoynx ussuriensis is a moth in the family Crambidae. It was described by Rebel in 1910. It is found in Russia and Japan.

References

Acentropinae
Moths described in 1910